The Singer and the Song is the 1971 second album by Labi Siffre.

All songs written and performed by Labi Siffre. Musical Directors were Gordon Beck and John Bell. The album was recorded at Chappell Studios and IBC Studios and was produced by Labi Siffre and Ian Green.

The re-mastered album was released on CD in 2006 by EMI featuring 6 bonus tracks and liner notes by Labi Siffre.

Track listing
 "There's Nothing in the World Like Love" – 3:58
 "You're Lovely" – 0:32
 "A Number of Words" – 2:34
 "Who Do You See" – 3:04
 "Not So Long Ago" – 2:05
 "The Shadow of Our Love" – 3:35
 "When I'm On My Own You Are On My Mind" – 1:25
 "Rocking Chair" – 2:28
 "Interlude" – 3:06
 "Thank Your Lucky Star" – 3:02
 "Talk About" – 2:42
 "Relax" - 2:36
 "Bless The Telephone" - 1:41
 "Summer Is Coming" - 3:13
 "Goodbye" - 0:44

Bonus Tracks on 2006 CD Reissue
 "Get to the Country" - 3:01
 "Till Nighttime Comes Along" - 3:35
 "Fallin' for You" - 2:39
 "Oh What a Day" - 2:25
 "Just a Face" - 2:06
 "Seasons Come, Seasons Go" - 2:11

External links
Labi Siffre's own web site

1971 albums
Labi Siffre albums